This is a listing of the horses that finished in either first, second, or third place and the number of starters in the Private Terms Stakes, an American stakes race for three-year-olds at 1-1/8 miles on dirt. It is considered the key Triple Crown Prep Race held at Laurel Park Racecourse in Laurel, Maryland.  (List 1990–present)

References 

Lists of horse racing results
Laurel Park Racecourse